Zendee Rose Japitana Tenerefe, known mononymously as Zendee, is a Filipina singer. She rose to prominence after a video of her singing a karaoke version of Whitney Houston's "I Will Always Love You" was put on YouTube by Yuan Juan a.k.a. youngjay0918. Known on YouTube as the "random girl of SM Megamall" she gained a following and went on to sign with the record label Warner Music Philippines. Prior to her discovery, she had already participated in numerous singing competitions in the Philippines.

Personal life
Tenerefe lived in General Santos until she moved to Manila to audition for the ABS-CBN talent search X Factor Philippines. She failed to go far in the local version of X Factor but still made efforts to continue singing. Tenerefe also won as the Gensan Pop Idol in 2011, an annual competition every Tuna Festival.

Discovery and viral video
On July 28, 2012, a video called "Random Girl" was uploaded to the video site YouTube by youngjay0918 a.k.a. Yuan Juan. The video showed Tenerefe performing karaoke at the SM Megamall, Philippines. Her singing brought attention from viewers around the world and immediately became a viral video. The original video got over 2 million views in three months. The video prompted the GMA Network magazine show, Kapuso Mo, Jessica Soho to look for her and when she was found they featured her in one of their episodes. She admitted later that she sang in public to try and gain people's attention.

Another video of her singing at the same event was uploaded to YouTube where she sings "And I Am Telling You" from the musical Dreamgirls.

Musical career
After Tenerefe was identified she began to be invited to TV shows. Her most "global" exposure was her appearance on The Ellen DeGeneres Show after being invited by Ellen DeGeneres herself. Tenerefe is the fifth Philippine-raised singer to be invited after global superstar Charice, Ramiele Malubay, Rhap Salazar and Journey frontman Arnel Pineda. She also met singer Jason Mraz and was the opening act in one of his concerts. Zendee released her debut album, I Believe, in 2013. It has 10 songs and an acoustic version of her song "Runaway". Her second album, Z, was released in 2015.

Discography
Albums
 I Believe (2013)
 Z (2015)

Singles
 "Runaway" (2012)
 "Cutie Uyyy" (2021)

Shows and guest appearances
Sing Galing Now Zending (2021–present) // Online Digiverse host 
Party Pilipinas (2012) // guest performer
Tawag ng Tanghalan (2019) // celebrity performer; she sings Run to You by Whitney Houston
Magpakailanman: Zendee Life Story (2012) // guest; portrayed role by Louise delos Reyes
Lunch Out Loud (2021) // guest performer
 Eat Bulaga: Bawal Judgemental (2020) // contestant; together with Marvin Fojas
Headstart (2012) // guest
Ellen (2012) // guest

References

1991 births
Living people
English-language singers from the Philippines
Filipino television personalities
Viral videos
Warner Music Group artists
People from General Santos
21st-century Filipino singers
21st-century Filipino women singers
Filipino women pop singers
Filipino Internet celebrities